Wesley O. Sims (born April 8, 1981) is a former American football player in the National Football League (NFL).

Football career
Sims attended Weatherford High School in Weatherford, Oklahoma and was a letterman and a standout in football and track & field. In football, he was a USA Today All-USA selection, and helped lead his team to the Class 4A state title as a senior. In track and field, Sims set the state records in the shot put (65 ft), and the discus (195 ft), winning the state championship four times indoor shot put, twice in outdoor shot put, and twice in discus.

He chose Oklahoma over Texas, Arkansas, Nebraska, Penn State, and Florida State.

Sims was drafted by the Miami Dolphins as a sixth round pick (177th overall), then traded with Jamar Fletcher to the San Diego Chargers for David Boston. He played one game for the Chargers.

References 

1981 births
Living people
People from Weatherford, Oklahoma
American football offensive guards
Oklahoma Sooners football players
San Diego Chargers players
Carolina Panthers players